Rah Chaman (also Romanized as Rāh Chaman) is a village in Miyan Jovin Rural District, Helali District, Joghatai County, Razavi Khorasan Province, Iran. At the 2006 census, its population was 1,372, in 368 families.

References 

Populated places in Joghatai County